Krsto Milošević (born 6 January 1988) is a Serbian handball player who plays for Steaua București.

Achievements
Serbian Superleague: 
Silver Medalist: 2014
Serbian Cup:
Gold Medalist: 2010
Serbian Cup :
Silver Medalist:2016
Liga Națională:
Silver Medalist:2017
Romanian Cup:
Gold Medalist:2016

References

Serbian male handball players
Handball players from Belgrade
Living people
1988 births
Expatriate handball players
Serbian expatriate sportspeople in Germany
Serbian expatriate sportspeople in Denmark
Serbian expatriate sportspeople in Romania